The canton of Sarras is an administrative division of the Ardèche department, southern France. It was created at the French canton reorganisation which came into effect in March 2015. Its seat is in Sarras.

It consists of the following communes:
 
Andance
Arras-sur-Rhône
Bogy
Brossainc
Champagne
Charnas
Colombier-le-Cardinal
Eclassan
Félines
Limony
Ozon
Peaugres
Peyraud
Saint-Désirat
Saint-Étienne-de-Valoux
Saint-Jacques-d'Atticieux
Sarras
Serrières
Vinzieux

References

Cantons of Ardèche